The Northern Lebanon School District is a small public school district in Lebanon County. The District is one of the 500 public school districts of Pennsylvania. Northern Lebanon was formed in 1957. The District serves six municipalities: Swatara Township, Union Township, Cold Spring Township, Bethel Township, East Hanover Township, and Jonestown Borough. According to 2000 federal census data, the District served a resident population of 14,984. By 2010, the resident population grew to 17,435. The enrollment of the district was 2,400 students in 2010. The district students are 96% white, 1% Asian, 1% black and 3% Hispanic.
Northern Lebanon School District operates four elementary schools (East Hanover, Jonestown, Fredericksburg, and Lickdale), one middle school and one high school.

Extracurriculars
The Northern Lebanon School District's students have access to a variety of clubs, activities and an extensive sports program.

Sports
The District funds:

Boys
Baseball - AAA
Basketball- AAA
Bowling - AAAA
Cross Country - AA
Football - AAA
Golf - AAA
Indoor Track and Field - AAAA
Soccer - AA
Tennis - AA
Track and Field - AAA
Wrestling	- AA

Girls
Basketball - AAA
Bowling - AAAA
Cross Country - AA
Indoor Track and Field - AAA
Field Hockey - AA
Soccer (Fall) - AA
Softball - AAA
Girls' Tennis - AA
Track and Field - AAA
Volleyball - AA

Middle School Sports

Boys
Basketball
Cross Country
Football
Indoor Track and Field
Soccer
Track and Field
Wrestling	

Girls
Basketball
Cross Country
Field Hockey
Indoor Track and Field
Soccer (Fall)
Track and Field 

According to PIAA directory July 2013

References

External links
 Official website

School districts established in 1956
School districts in Lebanon County, Pennsylvania
1956 establishments in Pennsylvania